The ninth South American Junior Championships in Athletics were held in Asunción, Paraguay from October 21–25, 1972.

Participation (unofficial)
Detailed result lists can be found on the "World Junior Athletics History" website.  An unofficial count yields the number of about 194 athletes from about 8 countries:  Argentina (40), Brazil (32), Chile (33), Colombia (22), Ecuador (6), Paraguay (24), Peru (22), Uruguay (15).

Medal summary
Medal winners are published for men and women
Complete results can be found on the "World Junior Athletics History" website.

Men

* = another source rather states: Hexathlon

Women

Medal table (unofficial)

References

External links
World Junior Athletics History

South American U20 Championships in Athletics
1972 in Paraguayan sport
South American U20 Championships
International athletics competitions hosted by Paraguay
1972 in youth sport
October 1972 sports events in South America
Sports competitions in Asunción
1970s in Asunción